Sven Tomas Gustafson (born 28 December 1959) is a retired Swedish speed skater, and one of the most successful distance skaters of the 1980s.

Early career
Born in Katrineholm, he won the World Junior Championships title, in Grenoble, France, in 1979. One year later, at the European Championships of seniors, he finished 4th. One month after that, he participated in the 1980 Winter Olympics at Lake Placid, New York, with a 7th place on the 1500 m as his best performance. In that same month, he defended his Junior World title.

1982 to Sarajevo leadup
In 1982, he became allround European Champion in Oslo, where he set the 10,000 m world record.  this is the last outdoor World record for men on a lowland track. Because of this performance, he was awarded the Oscar Mathisen Award, an award for the best skating performance of the season. One year later, on the same track, he won silver at the World Allround Championships, finishing second behind Rolf Falk-Larssen. Gustafson had the best allround point-sum (samalog), but Falk-Larssen won by the rule that a skater winning three distances, and merely having finished the fourth, is automatically pronounced the champion. This caused a renewed debate about the three-distance-wins rule which was subsequently abolished. From 1984 onwards, the champion was to be the skater with the best allround point-sum.

Sarajevo to Calgary leadup
One year later, his focus was not on the world allround championships, but on the 1984 Winter Olympics at Sarajevo. He won Olympic gold in the 5,000 m, ahead of Soviet skater Igor Malkov by a mere two hundredths of a second. In the 10,000 m, he once more found himself again in a close finish with Malkov, this time losing by five hundredths of a second. After these Olympics, Gustafson struggled through a knee surgery, meningitis, and the death of his father.

Calgary glory
In the Olympic year 1988, he had regained his form. In January, he won the European Allround Championships in The Hague, winning all four distances, an achievement no one else has been able to reach in post-war speedskating. With his nemesis Malkov retired, Gustafson knew he had to focus on outpacing long-distance skaters like Dutchmen Leo Visser and Gerard Kemkers and Austrian skater Michael Hadschieff. Gustafson managed to do so first in the 5000 m. He trailed Leo Visser's pace by eight hundredths of a second with only 400 m to go. However, he skated a strong final lap to win by one third of a second. Four days later, he won Olympic gold again, this time in the 10,000 m, setting a new world record time of 13:48.20. This record lasted for three years, when it was broken by Johann Olav Koss. Gustafson received the Oscar Mathisen Award again for his performances in 1988. He also earned the Svenska Dagbladet Gold Medal.

Late career
Gustafson's only notable achievement after the 1988 Winter Olympics in Calgary was a second-place finish behind Bart Veldkamp in the 1990 European Allround Championships. At the 1992 Winter Olympics at Albertville, he only participated in the 5000 m, finishing 13th. This was Gustafson's last international race.

Personal life
Gustafson is married to curler Elisabet Gustafson.

Records

World records 
Gustafson skated two world records:

Source: SpeedSkatingStats.com

Personal records 

Gustafson has an Adelskalender score of 157.701 points. In March 1988 he put himself in third place of the ranking, behind Eric Flaim and Michael Hadschieff. After improving his personal best time in the 1500 metres distance in December 1990, he reached second place. Gustafson was ranked among the top 3 for 1468 days.

References 

Tomas Gustafson at SpeedSkatingStats.com
Official website of the Olympic Movement
Tomas Gustafson (1994) Mål, vilja och seger Sportförlaget

External links 
 
 

1959 births
Living people
People from Katrineholm Municipality
Swedish male speed skaters
Olympic speed skaters of Sweden
Speed skaters at the 1980 Winter Olympics
Speed skaters at the 1984 Winter Olympics
Speed skaters at the 1988 Winter Olympics
Speed skaters at the 1992 Winter Olympics
Olympic gold medalists for Sweden
Olympic silver medalists for Sweden
World record setters in speed skating
Olympic medalists in speed skating
Medalists at the 1984 Winter Olympics
Medalists at the 1988 Winter Olympics
World Allround Speed Skating Championships medalists
Sportspeople from Södermanland County
20th-century Swedish people